Diego Olivera, (born on February 7, 1968, in Buenos Aires, Argentina) is an Argentinian actor.

Biography 
He began his career at the age of 12, in Teatro San Martín Work "Street Scene". Studying Theatre was formed with Alejandra Boero, Carlos Gandolfo and Héctor Bidonde. He rose to fame as a teenager with his character of Darío (Darius) on "Montaña Rusa".

He was built as an actor performing various characters in the musicals for her gifts as a singer in "La Bella y la Bestia" and "101 dálmatas" and children as "Tom Sawyer", "Cantame un Cuento", composed  Unitarios  Telenovelas characters. In 2006 while filming "La Ley del Amor" in Telefe canal 11, was chosen to star in "Montecristo" in México City, having a great impact in Argentina, for the network of TV AZTECA.

Then he was made in "Vivir por ti" also in Mexico City, MX D.F. with a wealth of the supporters and is now starring in Argentina's telenovela "Herencia de amor" by Telefé, his character is "Lautaro Ledesma" in the telenovela's villain. Today is one of the stars of recurring role as Padre Juan Pablo in "Triunfo del Amor", telenovela Televisa primetime.

In the film just roll the film in "Ningun Amor es Perfecto", with Patricia Sosa and already released with Vicentico, Martín Rejman's film in "Los Guantes Mágicos". Argentina Recognized most often for his villainous character in telenovelas. Before just traveling to Mexico D.F. to sign his contract to join with Televisa, Pol-Ka agreed to do a cameo for the telenovela Alguien que me quiera with Andrea Del Boca and Osvaldo Laport.

He starred as José Luis Falcón the main villain in Rosy Ocampo's telenovela Mentir para vivir. Eventually it ended after 101 episodes due to low ratings.

Personal life
He is the brother of the actor Federico Olivera. In the country most often been interpreted villains. He is married to actress Mónica Ayos, who has a daughter, Victoria and a stepson Federico by a previous marriage of Mónica.

Filmography

Theater 
Escenas de la calle (Scenes of the Street)
Tom Sawyer
La Bella y La Bestia (The Beauty and the Beast)
101 Dálmatas (100 Dalmatians)
Confesiones (Confessions)
Bingo

Television 
 90 60 90 Modelos (90 60 90 Models)
 Alta Comedia (High Comedy)
 Ricos y famosos
 Montaña rusa (Roller coaster)
 Mi Cuñado (My brother-in-law)
 Un Millón (A Thousand)
 Dr. Amor
 La Feve Petite
 Felipe (Phillip)
 Floricienta
 Amarte así (Love you that way)
 Se dice amor (Love is said)
 Montecristo as Santiago Díaz Herrera.
 Vivir por ti (Live for you)
 Herencia de amor (Inheritance of love) as (Lautaro Ledesma)
 Alguien que me quiera as (Bautista)
 Triunfo del Amor (Triumph of Love) as Padre Juan Pablo Iturbide Montejo (2010-2011)
 Amorcito Corazón (Sweetheart, heart) as Fernando Lobo Carvajal (2011-2012)
 Mentir para Vivir as José Luis Falcón/Francisco Castro/Sandro Carvajal (2013)
 Hasta el fin del mundo as Armando Romero (2014-2015)
 Lo imperdonable as Jeronimo del Villar (2015)
 Corazón que miente as Leonardo del Rio (2016)
 Nuestra Belleza Latina 2016 as Celebrity guest
 Mujeres de negro as Patricio Bernal (2016)
 En tierras salvajes as Anibal Otero Rivelles (2017)
Y mañana será otro día as Camilo Sarmiento Bedolla (2018)
 Vencer el pasado as Lucio Tinoco (2021)
 Corazón guerrero as Augusto Ruiz Montalvo (2022)

Film
 The Magic Gloves as Luis (directed by Martín Rejtman)

Awards and nominations

References

External links 

1968 births
Living people
Argentine male stage actors
Argentine male telenovela actors
Male actors from Buenos Aires
Argentine emigrants to Mexico